Ol Jorok is a constituency in Kenya. It is one of five constituencies in Nyandarua County.

References 

Constituencies in Nyandarua County